Rafal Edward Dunin-Borkowski (born 3 August 1969) is a British experimental physicist.  He is currently Director of the Institute for Microstructure Research (PGI-5) and the Ernst Ruska-Centre for Microscopy and Spectroscopy with Electrons (ER-C) in Forschungszentrum Jülich and Professor of Experimental Physics in RWTH Aachen University.

Education
Rafal Dunin-Borkowski was educated at the University of Cambridge where he was awarded a PhD in 1994 for research into semiconductors.

Research
His research involves the development of quantitative techniques in electron microscopy and has recently focused on the use of off-axis electron holography to study magnetic and electrostatic fields in nanoscale materials, thin films and devices.

Awards and honours
 European Research Council Synergy Grant 2019, jointly with S Blügel, M Kläui and T Rasing.
 Fellow of the Microscopy Society of America 2015.
 European Research Council Advanced Grant 2012.
 Ernst Ruska Prize 2009, jointly with M R McCartney and T Kasama.
 Royal Society University Research Fellowship 2000.
 Several awards for Science as Art.

Family
 His maternal grandfather was Stefan Soboniewski.
 His paternal grandfather was Sławomir Dunin-Borkowski.
 His first cousin once removed is Marek Trombski.

References

Living people
1969 births
British physicists
Alumni of the University of Cambridge
Microscopists
Academic staff of RWTH Aachen University